Jiří (Jirka) Matoušek (10 March 1963 – 9 March 2015) was a Czech mathematician working in computational geometry and algebraic topology. He was a professor at Charles University in Prague and the author of several textbooks and research monographs.

Biography
Matoušek was born in Prague. In 1986, he received his Master's degree at Charles University under Miroslav Katětov. From 1986 until his death he was employed at the Department of Applied Mathematics of Charles University, holding a professor position since 2000. He was also a visiting and later full professor at ETH Zurich.

In 1996, he won the European Mathematical Society prize and in 2000 he won the Scientist award of the Learned Society of the Czech Republic. In 1998 he was an Invited Speaker of the International Congress of Mathematicians in Berlin. He became a fellow of the Learned Society of the Czech Republic in 2005.

Matoušek's paper on computational aspects of algebraic topology won the Best Paper award at the 2012 ACM Symposium on Discrete Algorithms.

Aside from his own academic writing, he has translated the popularization book Mathematics: A Very Short Introduction by Timothy Gowers into Czech. He was a supporter and signatory of the Cost of Knowledge protest. 

Matoušek died in 2015, aged 51. In 2021, a lecture hall at the Faculty of Mathematics and Physics, Charles University, was named after him.

Books

Invitation to Discrete Mathematics (with Jaroslav Nešetřil). Oxford University Press, 1998. . Translated into French by Delphine Hachez as Introduction aux Mathématiques Discrètes, Springer-Verlag, 2004, .
Geometric Discrepancy: An Illustrated Guide. Springer-Verlag, Algorithms and Combinatorics 18, 1999, .
Lectures on Discrete Geometry. Springer-Verlag, Graduate Texts in Mathematics, 2002, .
Using the Borsuk-Ulam Theorem: Lectures on Topological Methods in Combinatorics and Geometry. Springer-Verlag, 2003. .
Topics in Discrete Mathematics: Dedicated to Jarik Nešetřil on the Occasion of His 60th Birthday (with Martin Klazar, Jan Kratochvíl, Martin Loebl, Robin Thomas, and Pavel Valtr). Springer-Verlag, Algorithms and Combinatorics 26, 2006. .
Understanding and Using Linear Programming (with B. Gärtner). Springer-Verlag, Universitext, 2007, .
Thirty-three miniatures — Mathematical and algorithmic applications of linear algebra. American Mathematical Society, 2010, .
Approximation Algorithms and Semidefinite Programming (with B. Gärtner). Springer Berlin Heidelberg, 2012, .
Mathematics++: Selected Topics Beyond the Basic Courses (with Ida Kantor and Robert Šámal). American Mathematical Society, 2015, .

See also
Ham sandwich theorem
Discrepancy theory
Kneser graph

References

External links
 Jiri Matousek home page
 

1963 births
2015 deaths
Mathematicians from Prague
Charles University alumni
Czech mathematicians
Researchers in geometric algorithms
Academic staff of Charles University
Academic staff of ETH Zurich
Combinatorialists
Topologists